Luke Rossouw is a South African rugby union player for the  in the Currie Cup. His regular position is fly-half or centre.

Rossouw was named in the  side for the 2022 Currie Cup Premier Division.

References

South African rugby union players
Living people
Rugby union fly-halves
Rugby union centres
Lions (United Rugby Championship) players
Golden Lions players
Year of birth missing (living people)